is a 2009 Japanese film directed by Yōichi Sai, based on Sanpei Shirato's manga series of the same title. The film is written by Sai and Kankurō Kudō, starring Kenichi Matsuyama in the titular role. It premiered at Toronto International Film Festival on September 16, 2009, to mixed reviews.

Plot
The young Kamui is a runaway ninja who has abandoned his clan, now constantly pursued by assassins. His travels bring him to a seashore village where he meets Hanbei, a fisherman who shares the former ninja's sense of honor. Though Hanbei's wife is wary of the stranger, the fisherman and Kamui become good friends. Life at the seaside seems idyllic but Kamui does not get to enjoy the peace for very long when his past life is catching up on him, and everything and everyone is not as it seems. Now he must draw upon his shadowy arts if he hopes to escape with his life.

Cast
Kenichi Matsuyama as Kamui
Kaoru Kobayashi as Hanbei
Koyuki as Sugaru
Kōichi Satō as Gumbei
Hideaki Itō as Fudo
Suzuka Ohgo as Sayaka
Ekin Cheng as Dumok
Sei Ashina as Mikumo
Yûta Kanai as Yoshito
Yukio Sakaguchi as Imperial Guard

Production and release
Kamui Gaiden was filmed in 2007-2008 at Nago, Okinawa. On April 1, 2011, Matsuyama married Koyuki whom he has met on the set of Kamui. In addition to Toronto Film Festival, it was also screened at London Film Festival in 2009, as well as at Rotterdam International Film Festival, Sci-Fi-London, the Asian Film Festival of Dallas and the Durban International Film Festival in 2010. The film was released as Kamui in the English version, and as Kamui: The Lone Ninja for the 2010 UK DVD and Blu-ray Disc releases by Manga Entertainment; it was also re-titled as Kamui - The Last Ninja by Cine-Asia in Germany.

Reception
English-language critical reception of the film was generally mixed. Rob Nelson of Variety wrote that "this would-be epic needs more show and less tell" as it "comes to a crawl too often over its two-hour running time," but applauded Matsuyama as "perfect as the brooding title character." Alternatively, DVD Talk's David Johnson said "it makes Scott Pilgrim vs. The World look like The Pianist" and "if you can get past the laughably bad effects work, there's ridiculous fun to be had with Kamui." Eye for Film gave the film 4 out of 5 stars, applauding its "immense visual beauty" which helps to "keep the viewer entertained and enthralled." Tony Rayns even called it "probably the best ninja movie ever made." However, EasternKicks.com, which gave the film 3 out of 5 stars, commented on Rayns' opinion by saying this would be true only if "your reference point is Ninja Assassin or Teenage Mutant Ninja Turtles," but called the film enjoyable. Kurt Halfyard of Twitch Film wrote that "function and value of art is a pretty high minded premise for a simple, populist action-melodrama" and "the collection of underwater, tree-top and sea-side ninja battles are not enough to enliven the whole turgid affair," adding that "Shinobi offers a more compelling scenario and characters and that is not saying much." Heroic Cinema, rating the film 6/10, stated that "when it comes to a movie that could have been great —should have been great— that’s a whole new level of disappointment." Cinema Verdict reviewer rated it 5/10, also finding Kamui to be a disappointment, "built upon a story and characters who didn’t capture my attention with its overall fake look." Nevertheless, James Mudge of BeyondHollywood.com wrote that Kamui "stands out as one of the better examples of the ninja genre," stating that Sai brought "Sanpei Shirato’s vision to life without too much grand standing, and the film is all the more enjoyable for paying equal amounts of attention to character and excitement."

See also
Kamui the Ninja (Ninpu Kamui Gaiden), an anime adaptation of the manga series.

References

External links
 
Kamui Gaiden at the Internet Movie Database

2009 films
Live-action films based on manga
Films set in Japan
Films set in the 17th century
Funimation
Japanese action films
Japanese drama films
Ninja films
Films scored by Taro Iwashiro
2000s Japanese films